Yoo Yeon-mi (born July 7, 1999) is a South Korean actress. She began her career as a child actress, notably in Jeon Soo-il's indie film With a Girl of Black Soil (2007), for which she received the Best Actress award at the Marrakech International Film Festival. Yoo also starred in the television dramas Golden Apple (2005), Great Inheritance (2006), and Missing You (2012).

Filmography

Film

Television series

Variety show

Musical theatre

Awards and nominations

References

External links
 Yoo Yeon-mi Fan Cafe at Daum 
 
 
 

1999 births
Living people
South Korean child actresses
South Korean television actresses
South Korean film actresses
South Korean musical theatre actresses
People from Daegu